Elizabeth Eloise Kirkpatrick Dilling (April 19, 1894 – May 26, 1966) was an American writer and political activist. In 1934, she published The Red Network—A Who's Who and Handbook of Radicalism for Patriots, which catalogs over 1,300 suspected communists and their sympathizers. Her books and lecture tours established her as the pre-eminent female right-wing activist of the 1930s, and one of the most outspoken critics of the New Deal.

Dilling was the best-known leader of the World War II women's isolationist movement, a grass-roots campaign that pressured Congress to refrain from helping the Allies. She was among 28 anti-war campaigners charged with sedition in 1942; the charges were dropped in 1946. While academic studies have predominantly ignored both the anti-war "Mothers' movement" and right-wing activist women in general, Dilling's writings secured her a lasting influence among right-wing groups.  She organized the Paul Reveres, an anti-communist organization, and was a member of the America First Committee.

Early life and family
Dilling was born Elizabeth Eloise Kirkpatrick on April 19, 1894, in Chicago, Illinois. Her father, Lafayette Kirkpatrick, was a surgeon of Scotch-Irish ancestry; her mother, Elizabeth Harding, was of English and French ancestry. Her father died when she was six weeks old, after which her mother added to the family income by selling real estate. Dilling's brother, Lafayette Harding Kirkpatrick, who was seven years her senior, became wealthy by the age of 23 after developing properties in Hawaii. Dilling had an Episcopalian upbringing, and attended a Catholic girls' school, Academy of Our Lady. She was highly religious, and was known to send her friends 40-page letters about the Bible. Prone to bouts of depression, she went on vacations in the US, Canada, and Europe with her mother.

In 1912, she enrolled at the University of Chicago, where she studied music and languages, intending to become an orchestral musician. She studied the harp under Walfried Singer, the Chicago Symphony's harpist. She left after three years before graduating, lonely and bitterly disillusioned. In 1918, she married Albert Dilling, an engineer studying law who attended the same Episcopalian church as Elizabeth. The couple were well off financially, thanks to Elizabeth's inherited money and Albert's job as chief engineer for the Chicago Sewerage District. They lived in Wilmette, a Chicago suburb, and had two children, Kirkpatrick in 1920, and Elizabeth Jane in 1925.

The family traveled abroad at least ten times between 1923 and 1939, experiences that focused Dilling's political outlook and served to convince her of American superiority. In 1923, they visited Britain, France and Italy. Offended by the lack of gratitude from the British for American intervention in World War I, Dilling vowed to oppose any future American involvement in European conflict.  They spent a month in the Soviet Union in 1931, where local guides, who Dilling claimed were Jews, told her that communism would take over the world and showed her a map of the US in which the cities were renamed after Soviet heroes. She documented her travels in home movies, filming such scenes as bathers swimming nude in a river beneath a Moscow church. She was appalled by communism's "atheism, sex degeneracy, broken homes [and] class hatred."

Dilling visited Germany in 1931 and, when she returned in 1938, noted a "great improvement of conditions".  She attended Nazi Party meetings, and the German government paid her expenses. She wrote that "The German people under Hitler are contented and happy. ... don't believe the stories you hear that this man has not done a great good for this country." In 1938, she toured Palestine, where she filmed what she described as Jewish immigrants ruining the country. While touring Spain, then embroiled in the Spanish Civil War, she filmed "Red torture chambers" and burnt-out churches, "ruined by the Reds with the same satanic Jewish glee shown in Russia." She visited Japan, which she viewed as the only Christian nation in Asia, and in 1939, she returned to visit Spain, for a second time.

Anti-communism

Dilling's political activism was spurred by the "bitter opposition" she encountered upon her return to Illinois in 1931, "against my telling the truth about Russia ... from suburbanite 'intellectual' friends and from my own Episcopal minister." She began public speaking as a hobby, following her doctor's advice. Iris McCord, a Chicago radio broadcaster who taught at the Moody Bible Institute, arranged for her to address local church groups. Within a year Dilling was touring the Midwest, the Northeast and occasionally the West Coast, accompanied by her husband. She showed her home movies of the Soviet Union and made the same speech several times a week to audiences sometimes as large as several hundred, hosted by organizations such as the Daughters of the American Revolution (DAR) and the American Legion.

In 1932, Dilling co-founded the Paul Reveres, an anti-communist organization with headquarters in Chicago which eventually had 200 local chapters. She left in 1934, after a dispute with the co-founder Col. Edwin Marshall Hadley, and it folded soon after due to lack of interest. With McCord's encouragement, her lectures were published in a local Wilmette newspaper in 1932, and then collected in a pamphlet entitled Red Revolution: Do We Want It Here? Dilling claimed that the DAR printed and distributed thousands of copies.

Beginning in early 1933, Dilling spent twelve to eighteen hours a day for eighteen months researching and cataloging suspected subversives. Her sources included the 1920 four-volume report of the Joint Legislative Committee to Investigate Seditious Activities, and Representative Hamilton Fish's 1931 report of an anti-communist investigation. The result was The Red Network—A Who's Who and Handbook of Radicalism for Patriots, hailed with irony in The New Republic as a "handy, compact reference work". The first half of the 352-page book was a collection of essays, mostly copied from Red Revolution. The second half contained descriptions of more than 1,300 "Reds" (including international figures such as Albert Einstein and Chiang Kai-shek), and more than 460 organizations described as "Communist, Radical Pacifist, Anarchist, Socialist, [or] I.W.W. controlled".

The book was reprinted eight times and sold more than 16,000 copies by 1941. Thousands more were given away. It was sold in Chicago book stores and by mail order from Dilling's house. It was distributed by the KKK, the Knights of the White Camellia, the German-American Bund, and the Aryan Bookstores. Subscribers to Gerald Winrod's new journal, The Revealer, received a copy; fundamentalist preacher W. B. Riley, president of the Northwest Bible Training School, claimed he had given away hundreds of copies; and it was advertised and sold by the Moody Bible Institute. It was endorsed by officials in the DAR and the American Legion. Copies were bought by the Pinkerton Detective Agency, the New York Police Department, the Chicago Police Department, and the Federal Bureau of Investigation. A Los Angeles arms manufacturer bought and distributed 150 copies, and a tear gas manufacturer bought 1,500 copies, which it distributed to the Standard Oil Company, the National Guard, and hundreds of police departments.

In 1935, Dilling returned to her alma mater to accuse such people as university president Robert Maynard Hutchins, educational reformer John Dewey, activist Jane Addams, and Republican Senator William Borah of being communist sympathizers. Retail tycoon Charles R. Walgreen asked for her help to obtain a public hearing after his niece complained that professors at the university were communists. They demanded the closure of the university. The Illinois legislature convened to discuss the matter, ultimately deciding that the claims were unfounded. Dilling delivered a frenetic half-hour speech at the Illinois General Assembly, with calls from the audience to "kill every communist". She declared, "It is certain that the University of Chicago is diseased with Communism and that its contagion is a menace to the community and the Nation."
 
Dilling's next book, The Roosevelt Red Record and Its Background, published two weeks before the 1936 presidential election, was less successful. Like much of her later writing, it was largely a disjointed series of quotations. President Franklin D. Roosevelt's "Jew Deal" (as Dilling was calling the New Deal) was already a central theme of The Red Network, and it was already being debated elsewhere. Dilling later claimed that the House Un-American Activities Committee was founded largely thanks to her two books. She wrote a pamphlet attacking Borah, entitled Borah: "Borer from Within" the G.O.P., fearing that if he won the presidential nomination voters would be forced to choose between two communists. She distributed 5,000 copies at the Republican National Convention, and claimed credit for his defeat.

In 1938, Dilling founded the Patriotic Research Bureau, a vast archive in Chicago with a staff of "Christian women and girls" from the Moody Bible Institute. She began regular publication of the Patriotic Research Bulletin, a newsletter outlining her political and personal views, which she mailed free of charge to her supporters. Editions were often 25 to 30 pages long, with a youthful photograph of the author on the cover conveying a personal touch. The masthead of early issues reads: "Patriotic Research Bureau. For the defense of Christianity and Americanism".

Dilling was paid $5,000 in 1939 by industrialist Henry Ford to investigate communism at the University of Michigan. As well as distributing his antisemitic newspaper The Dearborn Independent during the 1920s, Ford was a financial supporter of dozens of antisemitic propagandists. Dilling discovered hundreds of books at the university library written by "radicals". Her 96-page report stated that the university was "typical of those American colleges which have permitted Marxist-bitten, professional theorists to inoculate wholesome American youths with their collectivist propaganda." She reached a similar conclusion when the Los Angeles Chamber of Commerce paid her to investigate UCLA, and when she investigated her children's universities, Cornell and Northwestern.

In 1940, hoping to influence the presidential election, Dilling published The Octopus, setting out her theories of Jewish Communism. The book was published under the pseudonym "Rev. Frank Woodruff Johnson". Avedis Derounian reported Dilling claiming that "The Jews can never prove that I'm anti-Semitic, I'm too clever for them." Her husband feared that allegations of antisemitism would damage his law practice. She admitted that she was the author at her divorce trial in 1942. She explained that she wrote the book as a response to B'nai B'rith. She stated: "It airs their dirty lying attempts to shut every Christian mouth and prevent anyone from getting a fair trial in this country" (for which she was cited for contempt).

Isolationism

Dilling was a central figure in a mass movement of isolationist women's groups, which opposed US involvement in World War II from a "maternalist" perspective. The membership of these groups in 1941 was between one and six million. According to historian Kari Frederickson: "They argued that war was the antithesis of nurturant motherhood, and that as women they had a particular stake in preventing American involvement in the European conflict. ... they intertwined their maternalist arguments with appeals that were right-wing, anti-Roosevelt, anti-British, anti-communist and anti-Semitic."

The movement was strongest in the Midwest, a conservative stronghold with a culture of antisemitism, which had long resented the political dominance of the East Coast. Chicago was the base of far-right activists Charles E. Coughlin, Gerald L. K. Smith and Lyrl Clark Van Hyning, as well as the America First Committee, which had 850,000 members by 1941. Dilling spoke at America First meetings, and was involved in the founding of Van Hyning's "We the Mothers Mobilize for America", a highly active group with 150,000 members who were tasked with infiltrating other organizations. The Chicago Tribune, the newspaper with the highest circulation in the region, was strongly isolationist. It treated Dilling as a trusted expert on anti-communism and continued to support her after she was charged with sedition.

In early 1941, when the movement was at its height, Dilling spoke at rallies in Chicago and other cities in the Midwest, and recruited a group to coordinate her efforts to oppose Lend-Lease, the "Mothers' Crusade to Defeat H. R. 1776". Hundreds of these activists picketed the Capitol for two weeks in February 1941. Dilling was arrested when she led a sit-down strike with at least 25 other protesters in the corridor outside the office of 84-year-old Senator Carter Glass. After a sensational trial lasting six days, she wept as she was found guilty of disorderly conduct and fined $25. Glass called for the FBI to investigate the women's groups, and stated in The New York Times on March 7 that the women had caused "a noisy disorder of which any self-respecting fishwife would be ashamed. I likewise believe that it would be pertinent to inquire whether they are mothers. For the sake of the race, I devoutly hope not." Isolationist leader Cathrine Curtis believed that the image of the Mothers' movement had been wrecked, and privately criticised Dilling's "hoodlum" tactics as "communistic" and "un-womanly".

Many of the women's groups continued to oppose the war after the attack on Pearl Harbor, unlike their allies, the America First Committee. Dilling campaigned for Thomas E. Dewey in the 1944 presidential election, although she accused him of "fawning at the feet of international Jewry". Her political activity decreased as a result of her highly publicized divorce trial, beginning in February 1942, during which dozens of fist fights broke out, involving both men and women, and Dilling received three citations for contempt. The judge, Rudolph Desort, said that he feared he would suffer "a nervous breakdown" during the four-month trial.

A grand jury, convened in 1941 to investigate fascist propaganda, called several women's leaders to testify, including Dilling, Curtis and Van Hyning. Roosevelt prevailed upon Attorney General Francis Biddle to launch a prosecution, and on July 21, 1942, Dilling and 27 other anti-war activists were indicted on two counts of conspiracy to cause insubordination of the military in peacetime and wartime. The case was the main part of a government campaign against domestic subversion, which historian Leo P. Ribuffo labelled "The Brown Scare". The charges and list of defendants were extended in January 1943. The charges were again extended in January 1944. The judge, Edward C. Eicher, suffered a fatal heart attack on November 29, 1944. Federal judge James M. Proctor declared a mistrial.  The charges were dismissed by federal judge Bolitha Laws on November 22, 1946, after the government had failed to present any compelling new evidence of a German conspiracy. Biddle later called the proceedings "a dreary farce".

Post-war publications
Following the 1946 trial dismissal, Dilling continued to publish the Patriotic Research Bulletin, and in 1964, she published The Plot Against Christianity. The book "reveals the satanic hatred of Christ and Christians responsible for their mass murder, torture and slave labour in all Iron Curtain countries – all of which are ruled by Talmudists". After her death, it was retitled The Jewish Religion: Its Influence Today.

Media references

A character based on Dilling named "Adelaide Tarr Gimmitch" appears in the novel It Can't Happen Here (1935) by Sinclair Lewis. The book describes a fascist takeover in the US.
"Who then, is Mrs Dilling? Upon what strange meat has she been fed that she hath grown so great: And what inspired her, she who might have taken up knitting or petunia-growing, to adopt as her hobby the deliberate and sometimes hasty criticism of men and women she has never seen." — Harry Thornton Moore, "The Lady Patriot's Book", The New Republic, January 8, 1936
"To see the lady in action, screaming and leaping and ripping along at breakneck speed, is to see certain symptoms of simple hysteria on the loose." — Milton S. Mayer, "Mrs. Dilling: Lady of the Red Network", American Mercury, July 1939
"I have rarely seen hatred take complete possession of a woman's face as when Elizabeth Dilling stormed around the corridors shouting. She seemed like a woman pursued by the furies. What she did not know was that the furies were not outside her, but in her own mind." — Max Lerner describing an encounter in 1941, PM, 1943/44

Works
According to the Library of Congress records, Dilling self-published the original printings of her books in Kenilworth, Illinois, then some 20 miles north of downtown Chicago. They were later republished by printing houses throughout the country, such as the Elizabeth Dilling Foundation in the 1960s, Arno Press in the 1970s and Sons of Liberty in the 1980s.

Books
 The Red Network, A "Who's Who" and Handbook of Radicalism for Patriots (1934, 1935, 1936, 1977)
 "Lady Patriot" Replies (1936)
 The Roosevelt Red Record and Its Background (1936)
 Dare We Oppose Red Treason? (1937). .
 The Red Betrayal of the Churches (1938). .
 The Octopus, by Rev. Frank Woodruff Johnson [pseud.] (Oct. 1940; Sons of Liberty, 1985, 1986)
 The Plot Against Christianity (1964)
Republished as The Jewish Religion: Its Influence Today.

See also

 Blair Coan

Notes

References

Bibliography 

Dye, Amy (2009). "The Powers of Perception: An Intimate Connection with Elizabeth Dilling", East Tennessee State University.

.

Smith, Jason Scott (2014). A Concise History of the New Deal. 1st ed. New York: Cambridge University Press. Cambridge Books Online. Web. April 7, 2016. 
Walker, Samuel (2012). Presidents and Civil Liberties from Wilson to Obama. 1st ed. Cambridge: Cambridge University Press. Cambridge Books Online. Web. April 6, 2016.

External links 
Prints and Photographs Online Catalog, Library of Congress

1894 births
1966 deaths
People from Chicago
American people of British descent
American Episcopalians
American women civilians in World War II
American political writers
Anti–World War II activists
Anti-communist propagandists
Antisemitic publications
University of Chicago alumni
American anti-war activists
Old Right (United States)
Place of death missing
American conspiracy theorists
Pseudonymous women writers
20th-century pseudonymous writers
History of United States isolationism
American women non-fiction writers
Far-right politics in the United States
American anti-communists
Activists from Illinois